The canton of Orchies is an administrative division of the Nord department, northern France. Its borders were modified at the French canton reorganisation which came into effect in March 2015. Its seat is in Orchies.

It consists of the following communes:

Aix-en-Pévèle
Anhiers
Auby
Auchy-lez-Orchies
Beuvry-la-Forêt
Bouvignies
Coutiches
Faumont
Flines-lez-Raches
Landas
Nomain
Orchies
Râches
Raimbeaucourt
Roost-Warendin
Saméon

References

Cantons of Nord (French department)